Montana Belle is a 1952 American Trucolor Western film directed by Allan Dwan and starring Jane Russell. It is one of several fictionalized movies about outlaw Belle Starr. The story is set in Oklahoma, where the real Starr was killed. The word "Montana" in the title refers to the part of the plot in which Starr, wanted by the law, alters her appearance, poses as a widow from Montana and becomes a saloon singer.

Plot
Oklahoma outlaw Belle Starr meets the Dalton gang when she is rescued from lynching by Bob Dalton, who falls for her. So do gang member Mac and wealthy saloon owner Tom Bradfield, who's enlisted in a bankers' scheme to trap the Daltons. Dissension among the gang and Bradfield's ambivalence complicate the plot, as Belle demonstrates her prowess with shootin' irons, horses, and as a saloon entertainer.

Cast
 Jane Russell as Belle Starr
 George Brent as Tom Bradfield
 Scott Brady as Bob Dalton
 Forrest Tucker as Mac
 Andy Devine as Pete Bivins
 Jack Lambert as Ringo
 John Litel as Matt Towner
 Ray Teal as Emmett Dalton
 Rory Mallinson as Grat Dalton
 Roy Barcroft as Jim Clark
 Ned Davenport as Bank Clerk
 Dick Elliott as Jeptha Rideout
 Gene Roth as Marshall Ripple
 Stanley Andrews as Marshall Combs

Production
Shot between late October and late November 1948, this film was intended to be issued by Republic Pictures. In April 1949, Howard Welsch, who had produced the movie for his company, Fidelity Pictures, sold the negative to RKO for $875,000, about $225,000 above the picture's cost. Finally, this Western obtained a Manhattan debut at the Broadway Palace Theatre on November 7, 1952.

References

External links

 
 
 
 

1952 films
1952 Western (genre) films
American Western (genre) films
Films directed by Allan Dwan
Films scored by Nathan Scott
Trucolor films
Cultural depictions of Belle Starr
RKO Pictures films
1950s English-language films
1950s American films